Emancipation or eMANcipation (styled as eMANNzipation) is a 2011 independent drama feature film directed by Philipp Müller-Dorn. The movie had its world premiere on October 25, 2011 at the Kansas International Film Festival where it won the Audience Award for Best Narrative Film.

Müller-Dorn initially came up with the idea for the film in 2006 after reading a newspaper article about a shelter for abused men in Hamburg. Since it turned out to be difficult to find abused men who were willing to talk about their experiences, the research phase took a lot longer than Müller-Dorn expected and the screenplay of eMANcipation was finished in early 2010. Principal shooting took place in Berlin and Guxhagen in Northern Hessia in July and August 2010.

From 2012 to 2020 eMANcipation was released on DVD and BluRay in the USA distributed by Olive Films. Since fall 2021 it is available on Amazon Video, Apple TV, Google Play, Microsoft Store in 56 countries around the world.

Cast

Urs Stämpfli as Dominik
Frances Heller as Angela
Michael Schwager as Holger
Roland Avernard as Gregor
Anna Görgen as Belinda
Sandy Horáková (fka Sandy Klein) as Denise
Peer Alexander Hauck as Lukas
Jan Marc Kochmann as Andreas
 Ulrich Meyer als Diplom-Psychologe Bohr
Hans Ulrich Laux as Horst
Yannik Burwiek as Dylan

Synopsis

Dominik Liebmann is a man at the end of his rope. He has seemingly lost all he had: his job, his house, his wife, his son, his fortune and even his dignity. Without a penny in his pocket he enters Berlin's only shelter for battered men. He meets Holger, the head of the 'Männerhaus' and its members.
After a psychiatric evaluation by the youth welfare office, he is ordered to engage in the group therapy session of the men's shelter so he can get custody for Dylan, his son.
After an initial reluctance Dominik participates and talks about his past:

While on a holiday in Northern-Hessia Dominik meets Angela: a 19-year old blonde, pretty face and a direct but charming demeanour. The sympathy grows into passion and they become a couple. When visiting Berlin later Angela announces to Dominik that she is pregnant, so he proposes. But the marital heaven turns rapidly to marital hell. Angela becomes loud, abusive, addicted to alcohol and starts to blow Dominik’s money while he is busy providing for his family. He tries to talk to Angela about her behaviour but to no avail. He just tries to avoid her progressively violent moods and her extreme rage. Angela’s violent behavior escalates. Angela leaves Dominik and takes their son Dylan with him.

In these sessions Dominik describes the marital abuse he suffered, but he still justifies and defends Angela's cruel behavior. At Holger's insistence Doninik decides to sign up for karate class. There he meets Belinda a divorced lawyer with two daughters. They start to date, but Domink has difficulties opening himself up, is avoiding uncomfortable truths of the past and keeps on justifying his wife’s abusive behaviours.

Dominik finally manages to break out of his own vicious circle of denial: realizing Angela’s behavior was indeed abusive, but more importantly that he allowed himself to be victimized and that he added to the violent dynamics with passivity and his lack of taking responsibility.

With Belinda's help Dominik gets the custody of his son, gets his old job back and moves out of the men’s shelter to start a new life with his son, Belinda and her kids.

Reception

Critical reception for Emancipation  has been mostly positive. Robert Butler of butlercinamescene.com considers it one of the best films of the KIFF.  Erin Tuttle compares the visual style of the film to Jean-Pierre Jeunet. Amos Lassen praises the performances  as "wonderful" and calls it "a film that really opens our eyes".

Awards

 WINNER Audience Award, Kansas International Film Festival
 WINNER Best Dramatic Film, IFS Film Festival Hollywood 
 WINNER Excellence Award, Rincon International Film Festival Puerto Rico 
 WINNER Best Foreign Film, New York Winter Film Awards 
 WINNER Best Actor Urs Stämpfli, New York Winter Film Awards 
 WINNER Best Foreign Film, International Festival of World Cinema, Kent, England
 WINNER Award of Merit, Lucerne International Film Festival, Switzerland 
 WINNER Bronze Bulb, Excellence in Indie Filmmaking, Vegas Independent Film Festival
 WINNER Director’s Choice Award, Litchfiels Hills Film Festival, Kent, Connecticut
 WINNER Indie Auteur Medallion for Excellence, Bare Bones Film Festival, Oklahoma 
 NOMINATED Best Director: Philipp Müller-Dorn, International Festival of World Cinema, Kent, England
 NOMINATED Best Cinematography: Mathias Geck, International Festival of World Cinema, Kent, England
 HONORABLE MENTION 60° N International Film Festival, Norway
 HONORABLE MENTION Los Angeles Arthouse Film Festival, USA
 OFFICIAL SELECTION Oaxaca Film Festival, Mexico
 OFFICIAL SELECTION Palm Beach International Film Festival, USA
 OFFICIAL SELECTION Victoria TX Film Festival, USA
 OFFICIAL SELECTION Boston International Film Festival, USA

References

External links
 
 

Films about domestic violence
Films about dysfunctional families
Violence against men
2011 films
German independent films
Films shot in Berlin
2010s German-language films
2011 independent films